This is a list of albums that reached number-one on the ARIA Urban Albums Chart in 2018. The ARIA Urban Albums Chart is a weekly chart that ranks the best-performing urban albums in Australia. It is published by the Australian Recording Industry Association (ARIA), an organisation that collects music data for the weekly ARIA Charts. To be eligible to appear on the chart, the recording must be an album of a predominantly urban nature.

Chart history

Number-one artists

See also

2018 in music
List of number-one albums of 2018 (Australia)

References

Australia Urban
Urban 2018
Number-one Urban albums